Pollockville is an unincorporated community in southern Alberta in Special Area No. 2, located  east of Highway 36,  northeast of Brooks.

References 

Localities in Special Area No. 2